Alessandro Lambrughi (born May 19, 1987) is an Italian professional footballer who plays as a defender for  club Pergolettese.

Club career
He made his Serie B debut on August 28, 2009, whilst playing for Mantova, in a 1–0 defeat away to Frosinone.

Following Mantova's bankruptcy and subsequent demotion to Serie D, Lambrughi joined Livorno on July 9, 2010, on a four-year contract.

On 16 August 2017, Lambrughi signed with North American Soccer League side Miami FC.

On 12 July 2021, he moved to Pergolettese.

References

External links
  Player Profile from livornocalcio.it
  Player Profile from legaserieb.it

1987 births
Living people
People from Cernusco sul Naviglio
Italian footballers
Association football defenders
Serie A players
Serie B players
Serie C players
S.S.D. Pro Sesto players
Mantova 1911 players
U.S. Livorno 1915 players
Novara F.C. players
U.S. Triestina Calcio 1918 players
U.S. Pergolettese 1932 players
North American Soccer League players
Miami FC players
Italian expatriate footballers
Italian expatriate sportspeople in the United States
Expatriate soccer players in the United States
Footballers from Lombardy
Sportspeople from the Metropolitan City of Milan